Dikti or Dicte (also Lasithiotika Ori;  "Lasithian Mountains"; anciently, Aigaion oros or ) is a mountain range on the east of the island of Crete in the regional unit of Lasithi. On the west it extends to the regional unit of Heraklion.
According to some versions of Greek mythology, Zeus was reared on this mountain in a cave called Dictaeon Antron (Psychro Cave). 
On the north of the main massif, the Lasithi Plateau is located. The topology of the mountain range is rich with plateaus (Lasithi, Katharo, Omalos Viannou, Limnakaro), valleys and secondary peaks. Some important peaks are Spathi 2148m (the highest point), Afentis Christos/Psari Madara 2141m, Lazaros 2085m, Madara 1783m, Skafidaras 1673m, Katharo Tsivi 1665m, Sarakino 1588m, Afentis 1571m, Selena 1559m, Varsami 1545m, Toumpa Moutsounas 1538m, Platia Korfi 1489m, Mahairas 1487m, Virgiomeno Oros 1414m. The main massif forms a horseshoe around the valley of Selakano. Large parts of the mountain area, including the Selakano valley, are forested with pines (Pinus brutia), Kermes oaks (Quercus coccifera), cypresses (Cupressus sempervirens), Holm Oaks (Quercus ilex) and Cretan Maples (Acer sempervirens). 
The fertile valleys and plateaus of Dikti/Dicte are of significant importance in the local economy.

The dominant feature of Dikti is the Lasithi Plateau, the largest plateau in Crete. It is a place with a long history. Diktaion Antron, is located here, a cave in which — according to one legend — Zeus was born.

Gallery

See also
 Britomartis
 Diktynna
 Dittany

References

External links

 Greek Mountain Flora 

Mountain ranges of Greece
Landforms of Lasithi
Locations in Greek mythology
Geography of ancient Crete
Mountains of Crete